Buzenki is a rural locality (a khutor) in Mastyuginskoye Rural Settlement, Ostrogozhsky District, Voronezh Oblast, Russia. The population was 146 as of 2010. There are 3 streets.

Geography 
Buzenki is located 55 km north of Ostrogozhsk (the district's administrative centre) by road. Rossoshki is the nearest rural locality.

References 

Rural localities in Ostrogozhsky District